San Ysidro Transit Center is a San Diego Trolley station in the San Ysidro neighborhood of San Diego, California. The station is the southern terminus of the Blue Line and is located on a short rail spur of the San Diego and Arizona Eastern Railway.

Located just north of the San Ysidro Port of Entry at the Mexico–United States border, San Ysidro serves primarily as a way to provide access to downtown for the thousands of international commuters and tourists who travel between San Diego County and Tijuana, Mexico. It also provides access to the large shopping areas, including the Las Americas Premium Outlets which are connected to the stop via a pedestrian walkway. An intercity bus station is located adjacent to the station. It is the second busiest station in the San Diego Trolley, with nearly 18,000 passengers using the station each day.

History
San Ysidro opened as part of the initial  "South Line" of the San Diego Trolley system on July 26, 1981, operating from San Ysidro north to Downtown San Diego.

This station was scheduled to undergo renovation starting December 2014, as part of the Trolley Renewal Project, though actual renovation construction did not begin until January 2015. Renovation construction at the station continued through December 2015 before completion.

Station layout
The station has two tracks, each with platforms on either side.

Bus connections
San Diego Metropolitan Transit System: 906, 907
ACN Autobuses
Damaris Express
El Corre Caminos
Executive Lines
Flixbus
Fronteras del Norte
Futura Net
Greyhound
Greyhound Mexico
International Bus Lines
Las Vegas Shuttles
Rapid Connection
Saenz Express
Ticketon
Tres Estrella de Oro
TUFESA

See also
 List of San Diego Trolley stations

References

Blue Line (San Diego Trolley)
San Diego Trolley stations in San Diego
Railway stations in the United States opened in 1981
1981 establishments in California